Tóutuó (头陀) may refer to the following locations in China:

 Toutuo, Yuexi County, Anhui, town
 Toutuo, Taizhou, Zhejiang, town in Huangyan District, Taizhou, Zhejiang